Bouna may refer to :

 Bouna, Ivory Coast, a town in north-east Ivory Coast.
Bouna Department
 Bouna (Di), a village in Di Department, Sourou Province, Burkina Faso.
 Bouna (Yé), a village in Yé département, Nayala Province, Burkina Faso.
 Bouna Coundoul, Senegalese footballer
 Bouna was a former name of the Algerian town now called Annaba.